
Year 34 BC was either a common year starting on Friday, Saturday or Sunday or a leap year starting on Friday or Saturday (link will display the full calendar) of the Julian calendar (the sources differ, see leap year error for further information) and a common year starting on Friday of the Proleptic Julian calendar. At the time, it was known as the Year of the Consulship of Antonius and Libo (or, less frequently, year 720 Ab urbe condita). The denomination 34 BC for this year has been used since the early medieval period, when the Anno Domini calendar era became the prevalent method in Europe for naming years.

Events

By place

Roman Republic 
 Gaius Julius Caesar Octavian pacifies Dalmatia and Pannonia forming the province of Illyricum, while Antony regains Armenia from Parthia. Octavian reduces the outposts defending the Liburnian town of Promona, sets up siege works and forces its surrender.
 Mark Antony becomes Roman Consul for the second time. His partner is Lucius Scribonius Libo. The latter is replaced with Aemilius Lepidus Paullus during the year.
 Antony advances into Armenia with an expeditionary force (16 legions) and marches to the capital Artaxata. He arrests king Artavasdes II and takes him to Alexandria.
 Autumn – The Donations of Alexandria: Antony distributes the eastern kingdoms as a gift to the children of Cleopatra VII of Egypt; he declares Caesarion, Caesar's illegitimate son, as co-ruler of Egypt and Cyprus.  Alexander Helios receives Armenia and Media; to Cleopatra Selene he gives the kingdoms of Cyrenaica and Libya. His youngest son Ptolemy Philadelphus receives the Egyptian possessions in Phoenicia, Syria and Cilicia. Antony establishes Cleopatra as a Hellenistic monarch at Alexandria and gives her the title of "Queen of Kings".
</onlyinclude>

Births

Deaths 
Julius Caesar - March 15

References